Anne C. Gray McCready (born July 7, 1960, in Williams Bay, Wisconsin) is a game designer and editor who has worked on a number of products for the Dungeons & Dragons fantasy role-playing game from TSR.

Early life
Anne Gray grew up in Williams Bay, Wisconsin, and went to the University of Wisconsin–Whitewater majoring in biology, switching to marketing after a year, and switching to English the following year, earning her B.A. in English in 1982. "My first job after college was working at a printing company, where I keylined ads, business cards, and menus, and got interested in graphic design."

Career
Gray "applied for a nice, normal job at TSR, as an Administrative Assistant with TSR's International Division, but I didn't get it. I did keep in touch with the company, and later that year I got another interview for a job as a Copy Editor. . . and I was hired." Although Gray was not yet familiar with the Dungeons & Dragons game at the time, she said "My first real assignment as a Copy Editor was to edit the revised edition of the D&D Basic Set. I swear, I hardly knew what the D&D game was about. . . . and before I knew it, I was stuck with the job of editing boxed set after boxed set." Gray was promoted to full editor after a year, and handled the D&D line and other projects. Gray met Ben McCready just after Christmas 1984, and they were married the week before Gen Con 1985.

Works
Anne Gray McCready worked as an editor on several Dungeons & Dragons game products from 1984-1986. She also did design and author work on modules such as Mystery of the Snow Pearls and Red Sonja Unconquered. Her editing work includes products from the Greyhawk, Ravenloft, Dragonlance, Forgotten Realms, and Birthright product lines.

References

External links
 

1960 births
21st-century American women
American women writers
Dungeons & Dragons game designers
Living people
People from Williams Bay, Wisconsin
Women science fiction and fantasy writers